Akaki (Greek: Ακάκι, Cypriot Dialect: Ακάτζι; Turkish Akaki) is a village in the Nicosia District of Cyprus.

Recently a major find has been made of a 36 ft x 13 ft mosaic floor of a Roman villa depicting horse races in a hippodrome from a 4th c. AD villa.

References

External links
Maplandia

Communities in Nicosia District